Schoppershof station is a Nuremberg U-Bahn station, located on the U2.

References

Nuremberg U-Bahn stations
Railway stations in Germany opened in 1993
Transport infrastructure completed in 1993